LoveWorld USA is an American Christian cable television network launched by Chris Oyakhilome  and Benny Hinn in 2017. It is currently available on Charter Spectrum and DirecTV as well as other small cable operators in the U.S. Currently LoveWorld USA stopped cable broadcasting and is not available on DirectTV and Charter Spectrum channels, but is still available streaming on its website.

References

Aliso Viejo, California
Christian television networks
Television networks in the United States
2017 establishments in California
Television channels and stations established in 2017
Religious television stations in the United States